Owen Leslie Hardy  (31 July 1922 – 4 January 2018) was a Royal New Zealand Air Force (RNZAF) pilot flew combat sorties  during the Second World War.
Hardy was born on 31 July 1922 in Auckland, New Zealand. Before joining the RNZAF in March 1941 he worked as a mechanical engineer.

After completing training in Canada he was sent to the United Kingdom in October 1941. The following month he attended 61 OTU (Operational Training Unit) at RAF Heston.

After acting as a Staff Pilot he was posted to 72 Squadron in March 1942. In November 1942 he travelled with the squadron to participate in the North African Campaign. He served there until June 1943. While in Africa Hardy was awarded the Distinguished Flying Cross (DFC) in May 1943.

Returning to the UK he became an instructor with 61 OTU at RAF Rednal. He was detached from there in August 1943 to attend the Central Gunnery School (CGS) at RAF Sutton Bridge. In April 1944 Hardy was posted to 485 Squadron with whom he remained until August 1945. After the end of hostilities he was awarded the Bar to his DFC.

Hardy's air combat victories during the war came to 3 definite, 3 shared, 1 probable, 5 damaged and 1 destroyed on the ground.

Hardy returned to New Zealand in December 1945 to attend university. He returned to the UK in 1947 and joined the Royal Air Force. Following a flying refresher course he was posted to 54 Squadron to fly the de Havilland Vampire. April 1948 saw Hardy detached and posted to 247 Squadron to lead a flight. He returned to 54 Squadron in August of the same year. From 54 Squadron he returned to 72 Squadron in November 1948 as a flight commander.

The 1950s began with Hardy becoming an instructor in the Vampire Technical Flight at RAF Stradishall in February 1950. In January 1951 Hardy was posed to Gütersloh in West Germany as tasked with reforming 71 Squadron. In 1953 he converted from the de Havilland Vampire to the Canadair Sabre at RAF Wildenrath. Hardy was then posted to the Air Defence Operations Centre at RAF Fighter Command Headquarters.

In January 1956 he attended the RAF Staff College before serving in the Air Ministry from 1957 to 1960. From the Air Ministry Hardy was posted to RAF Watton as Wing Commander Operations with the Missile Wing. In July 1963, Hardy was posted to the Headquarters at RAF Episkopi on Cyprus.

After Cyprus, Hardy attended the Senior Officers' War Course at Greenwich from September 1965 to March 1966. After the course he was posted to RAF North Coates as commanding officer.

He retired as a Wing Commander in 1969 and became a planning officer for Portsmouth City Council and later Hampshire County Council.

In 2016 he was awarded France's Legion d'honneur in recognition of his wartime service.

In 2017, still flying, he performed a barrel-roll in a Spitfire during a flight on his 95th birthday. It was his first flight in a Spitfire in 70 years having last flown one in 1947. Speaking about the flight the New Zealand Herald reported his thoughts on the experience -

He died on 4 January 2018 after developing influenza.

References

External links

1922 births
2018 deaths
Recipients of the Legion of Honour
Deaths from influenza
Recipients of the Distinguished Flying Cross (United Kingdom)
New Zealand recipients of the Air Force Cross (United Kingdom)
People from Auckland
Royal New Zealand Air Force personnel
New Zealand emigrants to the United Kingdom
Royal Air Force officers
Local government officers in England